Aana (عانا) is a village in the Western Bekaa District of Lebanon, about  from Beirut. Its name comes from the Syriac word "'ono", which means 'the flock'. The village has two churches, one dedicated to St. Elias (Elijah) and the other to the Virgin Mary in the adjacent borough of Deir Tahniche. The village produces wine and fruit.

History
In 1838, Eli Smith noted  it as ''Ana; a village on the West side of the Beqaa Valley.

Physical properties 
Average altitude:

References

Bibliography

External links
Aana, localiban
Lebanon Panorama

Populated places in Western Beqaa District